The 4404th Wing (Provisional) is an inactive United States Air Force unit. It was last was assigned to the Air Combat Command (ACC), stationed at Prince Sultan Air Base, Saudi Arabia.

The mission of the 4404th Wing (Provisional) was to serve as the front line defense against possible Iraqi aggression after the 1991 Gulf War. It enforced United Nations Security Council Resolutions 687, 688, and 949 and protected United States military forces stationed in Kuwait, the United Arab Emirates and Saudi Arabia. The wing was inactivated on 1 October 1998.

History
Established by Tactical Air Command at Prince Sultan Air Base, Al Kharj, Saudi Arabia, to partially replace provisional air divisions established during the 1991 Gulf War. The original assets of the 4404th TFW came from the 4th TFW (Provisional), which had operated during the Gulf War. In June 1991 the wing relocated to King Abdul Aziz Air Base, Dahran, where it was officially activated as the 4404th Wing (Provisional) on 2 August 1991.

From the start of Operation Southern Watch, the Wing was structured and manned to carry out a temporary mission, insuring that Iraq complied with the post-Operation Desert Storm United Nations sanctions. It later was engaged in (Operation Provide Comfort, and later Operation Northern Watch were commanded by the US European Command (EUCOM)). The 4404th consisted of six provisional groups assigned at nine locations in the Persian Gulf region, including Riyadh, Saudi Arabia, and Kuwait.

During the 1990s and early 2000s, more than 5,000 airmen made up the wing, manned primarily by airmen who rotated to Saudi Arabia on temporary duty assignments. During Operation Vigilant Warrior, the number of personnel peaked at about 7000. However, the wing was manned at minimum levels. This policy was intended to reduce the visibility of U.S. forces in Saudi Arabia, limit exposure to risk, reduce the impact on Air Force units worldwide from whom the airmen were assigned, and insure that they were fully committed during their short tours of duty. This manning provided little flexibility to respond to changes in threat or mission requirements.

Air Force flying squadrons were assigned as units to the 4404th Operations Group (Provisional) on 15-, 30-, 45-, 60-, and 90-day rotations depending on the type unit. Air Expeditionary Force III forces that deployed to Qatar from July through August 1996 were under the operational control of the 4404th Wing (Provisional), under the tactical control of either the Commander, Joint Task Force-Southwest Asia or the Commander, Joint Task Force-Rugged Nautilus, but for force protection were under U.S. Liaison Office, Qatar which does not have the command authority to direct force protection actions.

After a terrorist truck bomb killed 19 airmen at Dhahran in June 1996 (Khobar Towers bombing), the wing was ordered to move to more secure location within the Kingdom of Saudi Arabia. As a result, it was moved back to Prince Sultan Air Base.

It was inactivated and re-designated as the 363d Air Expeditionary Wing on 1 October 1998 as part of the implementation of the Air Expeditionary Force (AEF) concept.

Lineage
 Activated by Tactical Air Command as 4404th Tactical Fighter Wing (Provisional) on 13 March 1991
 Assumed equipment and personnel of 4th Tactical Fighter Wing (Provisional)
 Re-designated: 4404th Composite Wing (Provisional), 17 June 1991
 Re-designated: 4404th Wing (Provisional), 1 January 1993
 Inactivated on: 1 October 1998
 Personnel and equipment reassigned to 363d Air Expeditionary Wing

Assignments
 United States Central Command Air Forces, 13 March 1991
 Air Combat Command, 2 June 1992 – 1 October 1988
 Attached to: Joint Task Force Southwest Asia, United States Central Command, MacDill AFB, Florida

Units

 4404th Operations Group (Provisional)
 Re-designated as: 363d Expeditionary Operations Group
 4410th Airlift Squadron (Provisional)
 Re-designated as: 363d Expeditionary Airlift Squadron
 Detachment 1 operated from Seeb Air Base, Oman
 4418th Airlift Squadron (Provisional)
 Re-designated as: 763d Expeditionary Airlift Squadron
 4402d Reconnaissance Squadron (Provisional)
 Re-designated as: 363d Expeditionary Reconnaissance Squadron
 4407th Reconnaissance Squadron (Provisional)
 Re-designated as: 763d Expeditionary Reconnaissance Squadron

 4413th Air Refueling Squadron (Provisional)
 Re-designated as: 763d Expeditionary Air Refueling Squadron
4405th Airborne Warning And Control Squadron (Provisional) (ACC)
Re-designated as 4405th Airborne Air Control Squadron (Provisional)
 4416th Intelligence Sq (Provisional) (AIA)
 Re-designated as: 12th Expeditionary Intelligence Squadron
 1621st Air Mobility Support Squadron Provisional (MAC/AMC)
 Re-designated as: 8th Expeditionary Air Mobility Support Squadron (AMC)
 4404th Logistics Group (Provisional)
 Re-designated as: 363d Expeditionary Logistics Group
 4404th Support Group (Provisional)
 Re-designated as: 363d Expeditionary Support Group

Squadrons were manned and equipped from units in the United States, PACAF, USAFE and Alaskan Air Command on a rotating basis.

Stations
 King Al Kharj Air Base, Saudi Arabia, 13 March 1991
 King Abdul Aziz Air Base, Saudi Arabia, 17 June 1991
 Prince Sultan Air Base, Saudi Arabia, 19 June 1996 – 1 October 1998

Aircraft
Fighters
 F-4G
 F-15C
 F-15E
 F-16

Electronic combat
 E-3
 EF-111A
 EC-130

Aerial refueling
 KC-135
 KC-10

Reconnaissance
 RC-135
 U-2

Cargo/troop transport
 C-130
 C-21 

Search and rescue
 HC-130

References

 Globalsecurity.org, 4404th Wing, accessed February 2018.
 AFHRA record search, 4404th Wing

Four Digit Wings of the United States Air Force
Military units and formations established in 1991
Military units and formations disestablished in 1998